White sedge is a common name for several plants and may refer to:

Carex alba, native to temperate woodlands of Eurasia
Carex albida, endemic to California
Carex canescens (syn. Carex curta), widely distributed globally and often referred to as white sedge in the United Kingdom